The men's singles was a tennis event held as part of the Tennis at the 1904 Summer Olympics programme. It was the third time the event was held at the Olympics. There were 27 competitors from 2 nations, with 26 coming from the host United States. The event was won by Beals Wright, with the Americans sweeping the medals. Robert LeRoy finished second, with Alphonzo Bell and Edgar Leonard eliminated in the semifinals.

Background

This was the third appearance of the men's singles tennis. The event has been held at every Summer Olympics where tennis has been on the program: from 1896 to 1924 and then from 1988 to the current program. Demonstration events were held in 1968 and 1984.

Beals Wright was one of the 1903 U.S. doubles champions. Robert LeRoy was the 1903 European champion. 

No nations made their debut in the event. Germany and the United States both made their second appearance.

Competition format

The competition was a single-elimination tournament with no bronze-medal match (both semifinal losers tied for third). All matches, including the final, were best-of-three sets.

Schedule

Draw

Finals

Top half

Section 1

Section 2

Bottom half

Section 3

Section 4

Results summary

External links

 
  ITF, 2008 Olympic Tennis Event Media Guide

Men's singles